Emiliano Gómez is a Colombian former footballer who played as a forward. He played internationally for Colombia, making a single appearance in qualification for the 1966 World Cup, against Ecuador on 20 July 1965. At club level, he played professionally for Medellín and Quindío.

References

Year of birth missing (living people)
Living people
Colombian footballers
Association football forwards
Independiente Medellín footballers
Deportes Quindío footballers
Colombia international footballers